Covfefe is a misspelling, widely presumed to be a typo, that Donald Trump used in a viral tweet when he was President of the United States. It instantly became an Internet meme.

Six minutes after midnight (EDT) on May 31, 2017, Trump tweeted, "Despite the constant negative press covfefe". He deleted the tweet six hours later but implied that its wording was intentional. Most media outlets presumed that he had meant to type "coverage". White House Press Secretary Sean Spicer stated, "I think the President and a small group of people know exactly what he meant."

"Covfefe" tweet and public response 
The tweet attracted intense attention in the news and on social media, quickly becoming a viral phenomenon. Both the word and tweet produced a variety of cultural, economic, and social influences. For example, the Volfefe index (for "volatility" and "covfefe"), created by JPMorgan Chase in 2019, measured the impact of President Trump's tweets on the U.S. bond yields. "Covfefe" was one of Trump's most famous tweets.

"Covfefe" quickly went viral and generated both jokes and speculations in social media and on the news about its meaning. It was retweeted more than 105,000 times, garnered more than 148,000 likes, and created a viral Internet meme on the morning of May 31. The hashtag #covfefe had been used on the Internet 1.4 million times within 24 hours of Trump's tweet.

Trump never acknowledged that the tweet contained a mistyping. He instead tweeted again at 06:09 after deleting the original tweet: "Who can figure out the true meaning of 'covfefe' ??? Enjoy!" White House press secretary Sean Spicer implied later that day that the tweet was not a typo but rather intentional: "I think the president and a small group of people know exactly what he meant."

The Google Search term "covfefe" surpassed the search term "Paris climate" (in reference to the 2015 Paris Climate agreement) on May 31, the same day Trump indicated that the U.S. may withdraw from the Paris Agreement.

Trump referenced the word in May 2018 by pronouncing it in a White House video about the auditory illusion Yanny or Laurel. He joked near the end of the video: "I hear 'covfefe'."

An analyst for The Washington Post, Philip Bump, wrote in July 2019 that the covfefe tweet represented President Trump's refusal to admit even minor misstatements. Other Trump critics in the media expressed similar opinions.

Subsequent references

Writing for The Atlantic in January 2019, journalist Adrienne LaFrance summarized the significance of the covfefe tweet: "Covfefe remains the tweet that best illustrates Trump's most preternatural gift: He knows how to captivate people, how to command, and divert the attention of the masses."

The covfefe meme produced a variety of follow-up effects in culture, language, and business. While marking the first anniversary of the covfefe tweet in May 2018, a USA Today article noted: "But did the president know what he had wrought on U.S. culture? The memes. The songs. The jokes."

In language and politics
The popular word game Words with Friends added "covfefe" to its dictionary in June 2017.

Dictionary.com announced that "covfefe" topped its list of 'unmatched queries' in October 2017 and continued to have the most user searches for a word without an entry. Brewer's Dictionary of Phrase and Fable added an entry for "covfefe" to its 20th edition in October 2018.

Lake Superior State University included "covfefe" in its '43rd annual List of Words Banished from the Queen's English for Misuse, Overuse and General Uselessness' in December 2017. The university's spokesperson noted that the word "became shorthand for a social media mistake".

Subsequent misspellings and mis-speakings by Trump have been compared in the media to the covfefe tweet. "Covfefe" is also often invoked when discussing gaffes made by other public figures, businesses, and organizations in public discourse.

Other uses of "covfefe" involve word play on similarity with the word "coffee". Examples include a coffee shop called "Covfefe Café", a beer called "'No Collusion' Russian Imperial Coffee 'Covfefe' Stout", various covfefe coffee drinks, an alcoholic coffee cocktail "Covfefe", a coffee and tea ad by Amul, a pro-Trump coffee brand "Covfefe Coffee", etc.

Anti-Trump protesters at various events in 2019 also used signs featuring variations on the covfefe theme.

In law

U.S. Representative Mike Quigley (D-IL 5) introduced H.R.2884, "The Communications Over Various Feeds Electronically for Engagement Act (COVFEFE Act)" on June 12, 2017. It would require the National Archives to preserve and store social media posts by the President of the United States. The bill was referred to the House Committee on Oversight and Government Reform on the same day but saw no further congressional action. Regardless, Trump's tweets have been archived in accordance with the Presidential and Federal Records Act Amendments of 2014.

In business and commerce
The covfefe tweet quickly spawned a variety of merchandise items (e.g., T-shirts, coffee mugs, hats, and bags) bearing covfefe-related inscriptions.

Covfefe inspired several board games, a caffeine tracker app, puzzles, gifts, toilet paper, and other products.

Both supporters and opponents of Trump in 21 U.S. states obtained customized "Covfefe" license plates by February 2018. The state of Georgia prohibits the use of this word on vanity license plates.

A 2018 Google Chrome extension called Covfefe allows Twitter users to correct misspellings in their earlier tweets.

Amazon pulled "Covfefe Coffee", a pro-Trump coffee brand promoted by a number of conservative commentators, due to its ads' usage of the U.S. flag in January 2019.

Upholding the denial of one of such applications, a January 2019 decision by Trademark Trial and Appeal Board of the USPTO concluded that the word "covfefe" was too commonly used in a variety of contexts and therefore cannot trademark for any specific product. At least 40 trademark applications filed with the United States Patent and Trademark Office for various kinds of covfefe-themed merchandise; none of those applications have been granted as of March 2019.

Using inspiration from the covfefe tweet, JPMorgan Chase created a "Volfefe index" in September 2019 to measure the impact of Trump's tweets on the U.S. bond yields. The name "volfefe" is a portmanteau of the words "volatility" and "covfefe".

In horse racing

A bay filly born in 2016, named Covfefe, won several graded stakes races in 2018 and 2019, including the 2019 Breeders' Cup Filly & Mare Sprint. She earned more than one million USD.

In literature, art, and entertainment

Trump critic Najah Mahir published a book The Ransom that Lies Demand: We the People and "Covfefe" in 2018 that he described as "a nonfiction book that boldly serves as part of a movement to attain knowledge and freedom while rejecting racism and harmful ideologies".

In January 2018, Strauss Group released a television advertisement for their brand of coffee, Kafe Elite, inspired by the tweet, starring comedian Guri Alfi in the role of the supreme leader of the fictional country of "CoffeeFi", an "empire of coffee". The country is implied to be modeled after militaristic South American military dictatorships, with Guri appearing in military garb and acting haughtily and buffoonishly, perhaps as a jab at Trump's image as well.

Make-up artists for RuPaul's Drag Race designed a wig called "Covfefe" for the show in 2019.

A project of The Daily Show, the Donald J. Trump Presidential Twitter Library features a piece dedicated to covfefe.

Alec Baldwin portrayed Trump on Saturday Night Live's "At Home" edition on April 11, 2020, to discuss the ongoing COVID-19 pandemic, referring to it as "Covfefe-19" while drinking Clorox bleach that he called "COVID juice".

Truth Social 

Following the creation of Trump's own social network Truth Social, he has stated that he will remain on Truth Social as his primary social media platform. On April 29, 2022, Trump used the Covfefe meme in his second post to Truth Social, posting the message "I'M BACK! #COVFEFE".

See also

 Bushisms
 Hurricane Dorian–Alabama controversy
 Donald Trump on social media
 List of Internet phenomena
 Use of Twitter by public figures
 Veracity of statements by Donald Trump

References

External links

 Trump Twitter archive  Searchable database
 Wayback Machine Latest Wayback Machine Link In English

2010s in Internet culture
2017 in Internet culture
2017 neologisms
Donald Trump and social media
Trump administration controversies
Donald Trump in popular culture
Internet memes introduced in 2017
Mass media-related controversies in the United States
Nonce words
Political Internet memes
Political quotes
Twitter controversies